Wolf Hess may refer to:
 Wolf Rüdiger Hess (1937–2001), son of Rudolf Hess
Wolf Hess (philatelist), German philatelist